Malta Temple (also known as the Salvation Army Building) located at 100 West North Avenue in the Central Northside neighborhood of Pittsburgh, Pennsylvania, was built in 1927.  The building was once the home of a fraternal order called the Order of Malta.  It then became a Salvation Army building.  In a 5 to 2 decision, the Pittsburgh Planning Commission voted to save this building from demolition in 2008.  The building was added to the List of City of Pittsburgh historic designations on August 5, 2008.

References

Clubhouses in Pittsburgh
Masonic buildings completed in 1927
1927 establishments in Pennsylvania